Events in the year 1880 in Chile.

Incumbents
President: Aníbal Pinto

Events
March 22 – Battle of Los Ángeles
May 26 – Battle of Tacna
June 7 – Battle of Arica

Births
Enrique Balmaceda (d. 1962)

Deaths

 
Years of the 19th century in Chile